This is a timeline of important Chinese texts including their final primary author and character count when available.

11th century BC

9th century BC

5th century BC

4th century BC

3rd century BC

2nd century BC

1st century BC

2nd century

3rd century

4th century

5th century

6th century

7th century

8th century

9th century

10th century

11th century

12th century

13th century

14th century

15th century

16th century

17th century

18th century

Timelines of Chinese events